Shakir Smith (born October 25, 1992) is an American professional basketball player. He played college basketball at Wyoming from 2011 to 2012, Pima CC from 2013 to 2014 and Adams State from 2014 to 2016.

College career
As a senior at Adams State in 2015-16 Smith averaged 20.7 points, 2.5 rebounds and 3.3 assists in 30.7 minutes in 28 appearances.

Professional career
After graduating, on August 10, 2016, Smith signed with Academic Bultex of Bulgarian League. On April 15, 2017, he was named MVP of Bulgarian League. On February 2, 2018, he signed with Macedonian basketball club Blokotehna. He made his debut for Blokotehna against Macedonian basketball champion MZT Skopje on February 5, 2018, scoring 8 points and two rebounds in 96–88 win over MZT at home. Smith signed for Swedish champions Norrköping Dolphins on July 21, 2018 for the 2018–2019 season.

In August 2021, Smith signed with Úrvalsdeild karla club ÍR. On September 3, he scored 51 points in a preseason game against Njarðvík. He was released from his contract in end of November 2021 after averaging 15.1 points and 8.7 assists in seven games.

References

External links
 Eurobasket.com Profile
 BGBasket Profile
 Adams State Grizzlies bio
 Icelandic statistics at Icelandic Basketball Association

1992 births
Living people
Adams State Grizzlies men's basketball players
American expatriate basketball people in Bulgaria
American expatriate basketball people in Iceland
American expatriate basketball people in North Macedonia
American expatriate basketball people in Sweden
American men's basketball players
Basketball players from Tucson, Arizona
Guards (basketball)
ÍR men's basketball players
Junior college men's basketball players in the United States
Norrköping Dolphins players
Sporting CP basketball players
Tucson High School alumni
Úrvalsdeild karla (basketball) players
Wyoming Cowboys basketball players